Raymond Hill or Ray Hill may refer to:

 Raymond Hill (musician) (1934–1996), American R&B saxophonist who played on "Rocket 88"
 Raymond Hill (formerly Bacon Hill), the hill on which was located Raymond Hotel in Pasadena, California
 Raymond Hill, founder and lead developer of uBlock Origin browser extension
 Ray Hill (American football) (1975–2015), American football player
 Ray Hill (British activist) (1939–2022), British political figure
 Ray Hill (American activist) (born 1940), activist from Houston, Texas

Hill, Raymond